Albardón is a department of the San Juan Province (Argentina). It is located in the center south of the same, which emphasizes a desert landscape with mountains and numerous plantations, highlighting the presence of prestigious wineries known nationally.

Toponymy 
The word Albardón, in Spanish, represents a kind of "Earth cord" (en español cordón de tierra) or hill that comes up on a piece of land. According to the tradition, this is what the Spanish saw on the north side of the San Juan River, and according to this feature defined the zone name.

References

Departments of San Juan Province, Argentina